Broad Street Mall, previously known as the Butts Centre,  is a large indoor shopping centre located in central Reading, England. There is a large multi-storey car park with direct access to the first floor of the centre.  It is close to The Hexagon theatre and the offices of Reading Borough Council.

History
Plans for the shopping centre were made by the Reading Borough Council in 1956, however it took more than a decade to find a suitable site and buy it.
The centre was originally known as the Butts Centre, and was named after the adjacent St Mary's Butts. The current name relates to Reading's principal pedestrian shopping street, Broad Street, and the centre is situated at the west end of the street. It was opened in 1971. The centre was purchased by Doughty Hanson & Co in June 2001 and sold in March 2004. During this period they implemented a business strategy to update and refurbish the shopping centre to modern standards. During this time footfall increased 50% and net operating profits increased 38%.

Shops

Below are occupiers of the centre classified as strong covenants
 Boswells Cafe
 Bride to Be
 Brother2Brother
 Burger King
 Card Factory
 F. Hinds
 Grape Tree
 Greggs
 Holland & Barrett
 Iceland
 Jelly
 118 Photography
 Reading Buses
 Martin's
 Metro Bank
 Poundland
 Reading Biscuit Factory (Cinema) 
 Savers (UK retailer)
 Slaters
 Subway
 Superdrug
 Taco Bell
 Thai-Grr
 The Works
 Therapists on the High Street
 Timpson (retailer)
 TK Maxx
 Wilko

Residential
In November 2018, plans were submitted to the Reading Borough Council for 530 residential flats in the Broad Street Mall development, however in 2019, Inception Reading resubmitted new plans for "493 flats in three buildings, one of which would be on top of the shopping centre". The two other towers will consist of one being 5 storeys and the second being 22 storeys subject to planning permission not changing.

Other facilities
There are public toilets a Post Office and a NHS walk-in health centre. In 2019, the walk-in centre was expanded due to its busy nature with £505,000 of funding from the NHS.
In September 2020, Co-Space Reading will open at Broad St. Mall which will offer a flexible and spacious working environment for local businesses. There will be 15 fully furnished office suites available to rent, ranging from between 4, 6 and 10 person, up to 50+ person spaces.

See also
 The Oracle, another shopping centre nearby.

References

External links 

 

Shopping centres in Berkshire
Buildings and structures in Reading, Berkshire
Shopping malls established in 1971